Imperial Tiger Orchestra is a Swiss group of modern popular Ethiopian music. Its name hints at the Imperial bodyguard band of the Halie Selassie era and Monty Python’s “Tiger in Africa” sketch It was formed after a jam organized by Genevan trumpet player Raphaël Anker.
The band has released three albums and played in Europe, Southern Africa and Ethiopia. It also worked with renowned Ethiopian musicians, like Endress Hassen or the singer Hamelmal Abate.

Biography 
When Imperial Tiger Orchestra first started unravelling the yarn of Ethiopian Music from the Golden Age (1969 – 1975), no one expected the thread to be so long and no one knew where it might end. Inspired by original albums that the band found while shopping for rare musical ornaments on a first visit to Addis Ababa in 2009, Imperial Tiger Orchestra released a first record in 2010, the aptly-named Addis Abeba, which explored Ethiopian music from the 70s – when traditional Ethiopian brass bands began feeding off American essence. The second release, Mercato, veered towards a more pop-inspired repertoire from the 80s, and the latest release goes one step forward, taking the listener deeper into Ethiopian culture, from the unique vibration of the azmari repertoire to the hypnotic race of the major tribes. After three years touring Europe, Imperial Tiger Orchestra has acquired a solid reputation as a mighty groove machine. The band has also taken its acid riffs to the African continent, touring South Africa, Mozambique and Zimbabwe back in 2010. Having been invited to Addis Ababa by the renowned producer of the Ethiopiques series, Francis Falceto, the Tigers were proud to meet many of the local musicians who work to change traditional Ethiopian music. Based in and around Geneva, Switzerland, Imperial Tiger Orchestra has also worked with musicians and dancers from the Ethiopian diaspora, receiving their rewarding confirmation and blessing for their own original take on Ethiopian music.

Discography 
 Addis Abeba, (2010)
 Lale Lale/Yefikir Woha Timu, (2010)
 Mercato, (2011)
 Wax, (2013)

References
https://mentalgroove.bandcamp.com/album/mercato

External links
 Official website

Culture in Geneva
Ethiopian music
Swiss musical groups